Nosratabad (also Romanized as Noşratābād) is a village in Aq Bolagh Rural District, Sojas Rud District, Khodabandeh County, Zanjan Province, Iran. At the 2006 census, its population was 607, in 112 families.

References 

Populated places in Khodabandeh County